Lake Rimachi (Lago Rimachi in Spanish) is a lake in northern Peru in the Amazon Rainforest of about  of extension. It is located on the western banks of Pastaza River, being its main inflow source the Chapuli River, and its main outflow the Rimachi River. The lands around the lake were home to the Murato people, who are now extinct.

See also
List of lakes in Peru

References

Rimachi
Rimachi